Guerrino De Luca is the chairman of Logitech's board of directors. He served as President and CEO from 1998 to 2008.

Early life and education 
De Luca holds a degree in Engineering from the University of Rome.

Career 
From 1995 to 1997, De Luca was President at Claris Corp. In September 1997, he resigned from his role as Executive Vice President of Worldwide Marketing for Apple Computer Inc.  He held that position from December 1996 to August 1997.

Guerrino joined Logitech in 1998. One of his main accomplishments was the purchase of webcam manufacturer Connectix.

Personal life 
Originally from Italy, De Luca now resides in San Francisco.  He has two daughters, Ottavia and Chiara, by his former wife Daniela.

References 
Businessweek CEO Bio
Article in Businessweek
Bio on Reference for Business

Living people
1952 births
Apple Inc. executives
Sapienza University of Rome alumni
Italian chief executives
Italian chairpersons of corporations
Businesspeople from San Francisco